Death Before Dishonor XVIII was a professional wrestling pay-per-view produced by Ring of Honor (ROH). It was the eighteenth event in the Death Before Dishonor chronology. It took place on September 12, 2021. The show was originally supposed to emanate from the RP Funding Center in Lakeland, Florida, but due to a surge of COVID-19 in Florida at the time, the location was changed to the 2300 Arena at Philadelphia, Pennsylvania. It marked the last time Death Before Dishonor had Roman numerals in its name.

Production

Background
At Best in the World, it was announced that Death Before Dishonor would return to pay-per-view in the month of September, with the ROH website confirming the date as September 12.

Storylines
The event will feature professional wrestling matches, which involve different wrestlers from pre-existing scripted feuds, plots, and storylines that play out on ROH's television programs. Wrestlers portray villains or heroes as they follow a series of events that build tension and culminate in a wrestling match or series of matches.

A key feature of the event will be the finals of the ROH Women's World Championship tournament. The tournament was announced by ROH Board of Directors member Maria Kanellis-Bennett at the ROH 19th Anniversary Show, while the brackets and title belt were revealed at Best in the World, where former ROH ring announcer Lenny Leonard was revealed as the special commentator for the tournament in the coming weeks. The tournament began on the July 31 edition of Ring of Honor Wrestling. On the September 4th edition, Miranda Alize and Rok-C defeated Trish Adora and Angelina Love, respectively, to move onto the finals at Death Before Dishonor.

On the August 10 episode of ROH Week By Week, it was announced that top ROH Pure Championship contender Josh Woods would challenge for the title at Death Before Dishonor. At Glory By Honor, Pure Champion Jonathan Gresham defeated fellow Foundation teammate Rhett Titus, and will now face Woods at Death Before Dishonor.

At Glory By Honor Night 1, Demonic Flamita won a Six Man Mayhem match featuring P. J. Black, Danhausen, Mike Bennett, Eli Isom, and Dak Draper to earn a spot on the ROH World Championship rankings. Later on, his old tag team partner Bandido made his first successful defense of the ROH World Championship against Flip Gordon. After the match, top contenders Flamita, Brody King and EC3 would confront Bandido, before the four got into a brawl. On Night 2, Quinn McKay announced that Bandido will defend the world title at Death Before Dishonor in a Four-Way Elimination match against King, EC3, and Flamita.

Also on Glory By Honor Night 2, McKay announced that two mystery free agents will be in singles competition against each other at Death Before Dishonor. On September 3rd, it was revealed that former WWE wrestlers Jake Atlas and Taylor Rust were the afromentioned competitors.

Homicide, Chris Dickinson, and Tony Deppen of Violence Unlimited challenged any pure wrestlers past, present, and future to a six-man tag team match at the event. On the August 31 edition of Week By Week, former ROH Pure Champion John Walters, ROH top prospect LSG, and independent wrestler Lee Moriarty answered the challenge.

For weeks, Dalton Castle has been attempting to improve the showmanship of Ring of Honor Wrestling, and started by attempting to recruit young wrestlers Dak Draper and Eli Isom as his proteges. After sitting ringside for their matches with each other, and a failed bid at the ROH World Six-Man Tag Team Championship at Best in the World, the three men had a three-way match on July 24. There, Draper pinned Isom after Castle threw a chair into Isom's head. On the August 31 Week By Week, it was announced that Isom and Castle will face off at Death Before Dishonor.

Results

ROH Women's World Championship tournament bracket

Honor Rumble entrants
 – Winner

ROH World Championship match

References 

ROH Death Before Dishonor
Ring of Honor pay-per-view events 
2021 in professional wrestling
2021 in Philadelphia
September 2021 events in the United States
Events in Philadelphia